Patrick Mackey (19 January 1920 – 19 February 1941) was an Irish hurler. His brief career included All-Ireland Championship success with the Limerick senior hurling team.

Playing career

Mackey first played hurling for the Ahane club, winning one Limerick County Championship medal. The 1939 Limerick Senior Hurling Championship success saw Mackey drafted onto the Limerick senior hurling team. In his one full season with the team, he won All-Ireland Championship honours as a substitute in the 1940 All-Ireland Hurling Championship, having earlier won a Munster Hurling Championship medal.

Personal life and death

Mackey was born in Castleconnell, County Limerick, the fifth of eight children of John and Mary (née Carroll). His father, nicknamed Tyler, was a former captain of the Limerick senior hurling team who won two Munster Championship titles. Mackey's brothers, Mick and John, also hurled with Limerick. All three Mackey brothers were member of Limerick's 1940 All-Ireland Championship-winning team.

Mackey joined the Irish Army where he held the rank of corporal. He died on 19 February 1941 from uremia at the age of 21.

Honours

Ahane
Limerick Senior Hurling Championship: 1939

Limerick
All-Ireland Senior Hurling Championship (1): 1940
Munster Senior Hurling Championship (1): 1940

References

1920 births
1941 deaths
Ahane hurlers
Limerick inter-county hurlers
All-Ireland Senior Hurling Championship winners
Irish Army soldiers
Disease-related deaths in the Republic of Ireland
Gaelic games players from County Limerick